Trisha Torrey is an American advocate of patient empowerment and patient advocacy.

Torrey became an activist after she was misdiagnosed with a rare form of cancer. While scrutinizing her own medical records, she found an error and avoided unnecessary and potentially damaging and dangerous chemotherapy. She founded the Alliance of Professional Health Advocates in 2009. In 2009 she wrote the book You Bet Your Life which detailed strategies for patients in avoiding mistakes. She advocates that patients empower themselves to get the healthcare they deserve, take steps to stay safe when they access care, especially in hospitals, and that they get a "full picture of a doctor's background", including where they went to medical school and their certifications and length of practice.

Selected works 
 
 
The Start and Grow Your Own Practice Handbook DiagKNOWsis Media  2017. 
The Health Advocate's Basic Marketing Handbook  DiagKNOWsis Media  2014. 
The Health Advocate's Advanced Marketing Handbook  DiagKNOWsis Media 2014.
You Bet Your Life! The Top 10 Reasons You Need a Professional Patient Advocate by Your Side DiagKNOWsis Media  2015 ASIN: B010YDQHOU

References

External links
 

1952 births
Living people
American non-fiction writers
American women non-fiction writers
21st-century American women